The 1984 World Figure Skating Championships were held at the Ottawa Civic Centre in Ottawa, Canada from March 20 to 25. At the event, sanctioned by the International Skating Union, medals were awarded in men's singles, ladies' singles, pair skating, and ice dancing.

The ISU Representative was Olaf Poulsen (Norway), and the ISU Technical Delegate was Elemér Terták (Hungary).

Medal tables

Medalists

Medals by country

Results

Men

Referee:
 Sonia Bianchettei 

Assistant Referee:
 Martin Felsenreich 

Judges:
 Linda Petersen 
 Maria Zuchowicz 
 Thérèse Maisel 
 Vladimir Amšel 
 Margaret Berezowski 
 Eva von Gamm 
 Walter Hütter 
 Vanessa Riley 
 Joan Gruber 

Substitute judge:
 Kazuo Ohashi

Ladies

Referee:
 Josef Dědič 

Assistant Referee:
 Benjamin T. Wright 

Judges:
 Ludwig Gassner 
 Marie Lundmark 
 Giovanni De Mori 
 Shirley Taylor 
 Jürg Badraun 
 Charles U. Foster 
 Alexandr Vedenin 
 Elfriede Beyer 
 Radovan Lipovšćak 

Substitute judge:
 Reinhard Mirmseker

Pairs
Olympic champions Valova / Vasiliev led after the short program, followed by Underhill / Martini and Selezneva / Makarov. Underhill / Martini placed first in the free skating and won Canada's first world figure skating title since Karen Magnussen in 1973.

Two pairs withdrew before the free skating – Massari / Azzola, due to Massari's recurring knee problem, and Watson / Lancon, due to Lancon's back injury from a fall in the short program.

Referee:
 Donald H. Gilchrist 

Assistant referee:
 Erika Schiechtl 

Judges:
 Claire Ferguson 
 Peter Moser 
 Sally-Anne Stapleford 
 Mikhail Drei 
 Frances Dafoe 
 Junko Hiramatsu 
 Gerhardt Bubnik 
 Günter Teichmann 
 Eugen Romminger 

Substitute judge:
 Mária Veres

Ice dancing

Referee:
 Wolfgang Kunz 

Assistant referee:
 Joyce Hisey 

Judges:
 Ludwig Gassner 
 Irina Absaliamova 
 Katalin Alpern 
 Vinicio Toncelli 
 Mary Louise Wright 
 Pamela Davis 
 Kazuo Ohashi 
 Suzanne Francis 
 Lily Klapp 

Substitute judge:
 Eugen Romminger

References

World Figure Skating Championships
World Figure Skating Championships
World Figure Skating Championships
World Figure Skating Championships
International figure skating competitions hosted by Canada
World Figure Skating Championships
Sports competitions in Ottawa
World Figure Skating Championships
1980s in Ottawa